"Shawty" is a song by rapper Plies featuring singer-songwriter T-Pain. Released in July 2007, it is Plies' lead single from his debut studio album The Real Testament and samples "Fantasy" by Earth, Wind & Fire. The song won an award at the 2007 Ozone Awards for Best Rap/R&B Collaboration.

Music video
A music video was shot in Orlando, Florida with director Edwin Decena. Rich Boy, Rick Ross, Lil Scrappy, Lil Duval, Trick Daddy, Young Jack Thriller, Diamond of Crime Mob, Edgerrin James, and Jevon Kearse  made cameo appearances.

Remixes
The official remix, "Shawty (R&B Remix)", features R&B artists Trey Songz and former Pretty Ricky member Pleasure P. A remix featuring Webbie and T-Pain was also released on the mixtape, DJ Smallz: The Best Thing Smoking Vol. 2 (We Still Smokin'). There is also a remix on Wu-Tang Clan affiliate Solomon Childs album The Art of Making Love & War featuring Both Plies & T-Pain.

Charts

Weekly charts

Year-end charts

Certifications

See also
List of Billboard number-one rap singles of the 2000s
List of Billboard Rhythmic number-one songs of the 2000s

References

2007 debut singles
2007 songs
Plies (rapper) songs
T-Pain songs
Dirty rap songs
Song recordings produced by Drumma Boy
Songs written by Drumma Boy
Songs written by Plies (rapper)
Songs written by T-Pain
Songs written by Maurice White
Songs written by Verdine White
Songs written by Eddie del Barrio